"How's My Ex Treating You" is a song written by Vic McAlpin and originally recorded by Jerry Lee Lewis, who released it as a single, with "Sweet Little Sixteen" on the other side, in 1962 on Sun Records.

Hank Williams, Jr. released his version, sounding "very much like Lewis's without a flashy piano", in 1977 or early 1978.

Background 
The circumstances of writing this song as recalled by Vic McAlpin are described in the Roger M. Williams's book Sing a Sad Song: The Life of Hank Williams:

Track listing

References 

1962 songs
1962 singles
Jerry Lee Lewis songs
Sun Records singles
American country music songs
Song recordings produced by Jerry Kennedy